Warwick House can refer to:
John Marshall Warwick House, a historic house in Lynchburg, Virginia
Julius Blackburn House, a historic estate in Scott County, Kentucky
Warwick House, a listed building in Nantwich; see Regent and Warwick House
Warwick House, one of the towers of TaiKoo Place, Hong Kong
Warwick House, Charing Cross, London, the home of Princess Charlotte.